Questo e Quello is a 1983 Italian comedy film directed by Sergio Corbucci.

Plot
First segment: the life of a comic book artist in a creative crisis is revolutionised by the casual encounter with a beautiful stranger.

Second segment: a writer in his sixties goes in the spas of Montecatini in search of inspiration. The daughter of an old friend, a 20-year-old girl, will awake his senses.

Cast

"This Impossible Love"
 Renato Pozzetto as Giulio Scacchi
 Janet Agren  as Lucy / Lucilla
 Gianni Agus as the Editor
 Nino Manfredi: as the Doctor 
 Michela Miti  as Fianceè of Giulio

"In The Red Beret"
 Nino Manfredi as Sandro
 Desirée Becker as Daniela
 Sylva Koscina as Mother of Daniela
 Renato Pozzetto as Gregory
 Paolo Panelli as  Doctor
Nanda Primavera as Grandmother of Daniela
Franco Scandurra as Prince

Release
The film was released in 1983. The film was a box office hit in Italy on its release.

Reception
In a retrospective review of the film, Roberto Curti found that Corbucci's direction was "sloppy and careless" and that the film was "basically an excuse for Pozzetto and Manfredi to do their comedy routine"

See also
 List of Italian films of 1983

References

References

External links
 
 

1983 films
Italian comedy films
1980s Italian-language films
1983 comedy films
Films directed by Sergio Corbucci
Films about comics
Films about fictional painters
1980s Italian films